The Love Racket is a 1929 American early sound crime drama film produced and distributed by First National Pictures. It was directed by William A. Seiter and starred Dorothy Mackaill. It is based on a Broadway play, The Woman on the Jury by Bernard K. Burns, and is a remake of a 1924 silent film of the same name which starred Bessie Love. The film is now considered lost.

Myrtle Stedman reprises her role from the silent version in this film.

Cast
Dorothy Mackaill as Betty Brown
Sidney Blackmer as Fred Masters
Edmund Burns as George Wayne
Myrtle Stedman as Marion Masters
Edwards Davis as Judge Davis
Webster Campbell as Prosecuting Attorney
Clarence Burton as Defense Attorney
Alice Day as Grace Pierce
Edith Yorke as Mrs. Pierce
Martha Mattox as Mrs. Slade
Tom Mahoney as Detective McGuire
Jack Curtis as John Gerrity

References

External links
 
 
Lobby poster

1929 films
1929 crime drama films
Remakes of American films
American crime drama films
American black-and-white films
American films based on plays
Films directed by William A. Seiter
First National Pictures films
Sound film remakes of silent films
Lost American films
1929 lost films
1920s American films